The 2009–10 season was the 111th season of competitive league football in the history of English football club Wolverhampton Wanderers. This season saw the club return to the Premier League after a five-year absence. They had won promotion in the previous season as champions of the Football League Championship.

Although this season was the club's 61st at the top level of English football, it was only their second season in the modern Premier League; their only previous Premier League campaign had ended in relegation in 2003–04.

The club avoided relegation, finishing 15th, some eight points clear of the relegation zone. Survival was confirmed with two games to spare, marking the first time they had avoided relegation from the highest level since 1980–81.

Season review

The summer transfer window saw the arrival of nine new recruits in total (seven permanent, two loans) at a cost of £18.5 million. The most notable new addition was Irish international striker Kevin Doyle, signed for a club record fee of £6.5 million from Championship side Reading. Serbian midfielder Nenad Milijaš was the next most expensive signing, bought to add additional creativity. The summer also saw contract extensions signed by Kevin Foley, Sylvan Ebanks-Blake, Jody Craddock and David Edwards.
On the field the players resumed training at their Sir Jack Hayward training ground on 29 June 2009, before flying out to Perth, Australia on 4 July for a two-week stay where they stepped up their training and played their first two games of pre-season. Preparations were completed with the only home friendly, a game against La Liga side Real Valladolid.

The season proper began with a 0–2 loss to West Ham United in the club's first Premier League fixture in five years. Wolves immediately bounced back by winning on the road at Wigan despite a long injury list, giving the club their first ever away win in the modern Premier League.

A further victory against Fulham put them 12th after six games, but this was their last victory for almost two months - a run which included a home loss to winless Portsmouth. Despite credible draws against the likes of Everton and Aston Villa, the team fell into the relegation zone with a defence unable to keep clean sheets. Heavy defeats followed against "Big 4" sides Arsenal and Chelsea, before a lacklustre home loss to local rivals Birmingham City put manager McCarthy under increasing pressure.

December saw a change of fortune with three wins in four games, including a surprise away success at Tottenham, to help propel the club out of the mire. The month also brought controversy though after manager Mick McCarthy opted to field an entirely new outfield line-up to the one that defeated Spurs when they visited Manchester United three days later. The uproar caused by the decision led to the Premier League requesting an official explanation from the club, resulting in a £25,000 suspended fine. 2009 closed with two successive defeats to Liverpool and Manchester City, but enough points to remain above the relegation zone.

The January transfer window saw the club make a club record bid to sign winger Adam Johnson from Middlesbrough, and a long-winded attempt to lure Stephen Hunt from relegation rivals Hull City. Both bids failed, as did late attempts for young defender Nathaniel Clyne and even a loan offer to former starlet Robbie Keane. With no permanent transfers agreed, the club instead brought in two loan signings, both from Belgian club Charleroi – Adlène Guedioura and Geoffrey Mujangi Bia.

The start to 2010 proved equally frustrating on the field with only two points taken from four games, as well as a convincing FA Cup exit at the hands of financially troubled Championship side Crystal Palace. The rot was stopped with a home win over Tottenham, which meant Wolves had completed their first top flight double since the 1980–81 season. Wolves added a second double over Burnley, before a draw at Aston Villa and then a 3–1 victory at fellow strugglers West Ham finished a series of three away game which yielded seven points from a possible nine, giving their chances of avoiding relegation a strong boost.

The team drew four of their five following games, their only defeat coming in the 95th minute away at title challengers Arsenal. This run of points helped assure their Premier League survival. Survival was mathematically confirmed on 25 April 2010 when Burnley failed to beat Liverpool, thus filling the final relegation spot.

The season was concluded with a 1–3 loss at already-relegated Portsmouth before a final day victory over Sunderland took their points tally to 38, yielding a 15th-place finish. This marked their highest position in the English football system since 1979–80. It also meant the club had survived at the top level for the first time in 29 years. Although they finished the division's lowest goalscorers (with 32), a strong defensive resolve meant they had conceded the least of the bottom 8 (56), creating the formula for their survival.

Results

Pre season
Wolves took part in their first foreign pre-season tour in five years as they traveled to Perth, Australia to train and play their opening two friendlies against A-League opposition in their first visit to the country since 1972. As had become common in recent years, only their final game was held at their Molineux home. A second "Wolves XI" team largely comprising academy prospects and out of favour senior players also played a series of matches during this period.

"Wolves XI" pre season results (all away): 0–0 vs Kidderminster Harriers (18 July), 1–2 vs Port Vale (22 July), 0–0 vs Hereford United (25 July), 1–0 vs Crewe Alexandra (29 July), 3–1 vs Wrexham (5 August)

Premier League

A total of 20 teams competed in the Premier League in the 2009–10 season. Each team would play every other team twice, once at their stadium, and once at the opposition's. Three points were awarded to teams for each win, one point per draw, and none for defeats. The provisional fixture list was released on 17 June 2009, but was subject to change in the event of matches being selected for television coverage.

Final table

Results summary

Source: Statto.com

Results by round

FA Cup

League Cup

Players

Statistics

|-
|align="left"|||align="left"|||align="left"| 
|13||0||3||0||0||0||16||0||0||0||
|-
|align="left"|||align="left"|||align="left"| 
|||0||||0||2||0||||0||2||0||
|-
|align="left"|||align="left"|||align="left"| 
|||1||0||0||||0||||1||3||0||
|-
|align="left"|||align="left"|||align="left"| 
|||1||2||0||0||0||||1||4||1||
|-
|align="left"|||align="left"|||align="left"| 
|33||5||2||0||1||0||36||5||1||0||
|-
|align="left"|||align="left"|||align="left"| 
|||0||0||0||1||0||||0||3||0||
|-
|align="left"|||align="left"|||align="left"|  (c)
|34||0||3||1||1||0||38||1||||1||
|-
|align="left"|||align="left"|FW||align="left"| 
|||2||||0||1||0||||2||3||0||
|-
|align="left"|10||align="left"|FW||align="left"| 
|||1||0||0||||0||||1||4||0||
|-
|align="left"|11||align="left"|||align="left"| 
|||0||||0||0||0||||0||||1||
|-
|align="left"|12||align="left"|||align="left"| 
|||0||1||0||1||0||style="background:#98FB98"|||0||0||0||
|-
|align="left"|13||align="left"|||align="left"| 
|25||0||0||0||||0||style="background:#98FB98"|27||0||4||0||
|-
|align="left"|14||align="left"|||align="left"| 
|||1||||1||2||0||||2||3||0||
|-
|align="left"|15||align="left"|||align="left"| 
|||0||||0||0||0||style="background:#98FB98"|||0||2||0||
|-
|align="left"|16||align="left"|||align="left"| 
|32||0||2||0||2||0||36||0||6||0||
|-
|align="left"|17||align="left"|||align="left"| 
|||3||1||1||||0||||4||3||0||
|-
|align="left"|18||align="left"|FW||align="left"|  ¤
|||0||||0||1||0||||0||0||0||
|-
|align="left"|19||align="left"|FW||align="left"|  ¤
|||0||||0||0||0||||0||0||0||
|-
|align="left"|20||align="left"|||align="left"| 
|||2||2||0||||0||style="background:#98FB98"|||2||2||0||
|-
|align="left"|21||align="left"|||align="left"|  ¤
|0||0||0||0||0||0||0||0||0||0||
|-
|align="left"|22||align="left"|||align="left"|  ¤
|0||0||0||0||0||0||0||0||0||0||
|-
|align="left"|23||align="left"|||align="left"| 
|23||1||2||1||1||0||style="background:#98FB98"|26||2||5||0||
|-
|align="left"|24||align="left"|||align="left"|  ¤
|0||0||0||0||0||0||0||0||0||0||
|-
|align="left"|25||align="left"|||align="left"|  ¤ †
|0||0||0||0||||0||||0||0||0||
|-
|align="left"|25||align="left"|||style="background:#faecc8" align="left"|  ‡
|||0||||0||0||0||style="background:#98FB98"|||0||0||0||
|-
|align="left"|26||align="left"|||align="left"|  ¤
|||0||0||0||||0||||0||0||0||
|-
|align="left"|27||align="left"|||style="background:#faecc8" align="left"|  ‡
|||0||3||0||0||0||||0||6||0||
|-
|align="left"|28||align="left"|||align="left"|  ¤
|||0||0||0||0||0||||0||0||0||
|-
|align="left"|29||align="left"|FW||align="left"| 
|||9||||0||||0||style="background:#98FB98"|||9||5||0||
|-
|align="left"|30||align="left"|||align="left"|  ¤
|0||0||0||0||0||0||0||0||0||0||
|-
|align="left"|31||align="left"|||align="left"| 
|0||0||0||0||0||0||0||0||0||0||
|-
|align="left"|32||align="left"|||align="left"| 
|||0||3||0||1||0||||0||1||0||
|-
|align="left"|33||align="left"|FW||align="left"|  ¤
|||1||0||0||||0||style="background:#98FB98"|||1||0||1||
|-
|align="left"|34||align="left"|||align="left"|  ¤ †
|0||0||0||0||0||0||0||0||0||0||
|-
|align="left"|34||align="left"|||style="background:#faecc8" align="left"|  ‡
|||1||0||0||0||0||style="background:#98FB98"|||1||2||0||
|-
|align="left"|35||align="left"|||align="left"|  †
|0||0||0||0||0||0||0||0||0||0||
|-
|align="left"|35||align="left"|||style="background:#faecc8" align="left"|  ‡
|||0||0||0||1||0||style="background:#98FB98"|||0||0||0||
|-
|align="left"|36||align="left"|||align="left"| 
|0||0||0||0||0||0||0||0||0||0||
|-
|align="left"|37||align="left"|||align="left"| 
|0||0||0||0||0||0||0||0||0||0||
|-
|align="left"|38||align="left"|||align="left"|  ¤
|0||0||0||0||0||0||0||0||0||0||
|-
|align="left"|39||align="left"|FW||align="left"| 
|0||0||0||0||0||0||0||0||0||0||
|-
|align="left"|40||align="left"|||align="left"|  ¤
|0||0||0||0||0||0||0||0||0||0||
|-
|align="left"|41||align="left"|FW||align="left"| 
|0||0||0||0||0||0||0||0||0||0||
|-
|align="left"|42||align="left"|||align="left"|  ¤
|0||0||0||0||0||0||0||0||0||0||
|-
|align="left"|43||align="left"|FW||align="left"| 
|0||0||0||0||0||0||0||0||0||0||
|-
|align="left"|44||align="left"|||align="left"| 
|0||0||0||0||||0||style="background:#98FB98"|||0||0||0||
|}

Awards

Transfers

In

Out

Loans in

Loans out

Management and coaching staff

Kit
The season saw a new home and away kit, both manufactured by Le Coq Sportif. The away kit was notable in featuring red trims, a reference to their original red and white stripes when the club was first formed. Both shirts featured the club's new sponsor, the internet gambling company Sportingbet.com.

See also
2009–10 Premier Reserve League

References

2009–10 Premier League by team
2009-10